The Space Telescope Imaging Spectrograph (STIS) is a spectrograph, also with a camera mode, installed on the Hubble Space Telescope. Aerospace engineer Bruce Woodgate of the Goddard Space Flight Center was the principal investigator and creator of the STIS. It operated continuously from 1997 until a power supply failure in August 2004. After repairs, it began operating again in 2009. The spectrograph has made many important observations, including the first spectrum of the atmosphere of an extrasolar planet, HD 209458b.

The STIS was installed on Hubble in 1997 during its second servicing mission (STS-82)  by Mark Lee and Steven Smith, replacing the High Resolution Spectrograph and the Faint Object Spectrograph.  It was designed to operate for five years.  On August 3, 2004, an electronic failure rendered STIS inoperable, ending its use 2 years beyond its predicted lifespan. In order to bring it back to operational status, the instrument was repaired by space shuttle astronauts during STS-125, Servicing Mission 4, launched on May 11, 2009. The crew did a long (many hour) EVA to repair the instrument.

Design
STIS is both a spectrograph and an imaging camera, and is focused on ultraviolet light.

The STIS has three 1024×1024 detector arrays. The first is a charge-coupled device with a 52×52 arc-second field of view, covering the visible and near-infrared spectrum from 200 nm to 1030 nm.

The other two detectors are Multi-Anode Multichannel Arrays, each with a 25×25 arc-second field of view.  One is Cs2Te, and covers the near-UV between 160 nm and 310 nm.  The other is CsI and covers the far-UV between 115 nm and 170 nm.

Timeline

February 14, 1997- STIS installed (STS-82)
 2001, Switches to Side-2 electronics after a failure in side-1.
August 3, 2004- STIS goes offline due to side-2 power-failure
2009- STIS repaired (STS-125)
  Operating on side-2 electronics with all optical and UV channels.

Selected discoveries and observations
On its 20th anniversary (1997-2017) NASA noted a selection of discoveries and/or observations conducted with STIS:
Survey of 20 galaxies to look for black holes
Study of the  Intergalactic Medium
Study of the Galactic Halo
Study of  Interstellar Medium
Chemical analysis of an atmosphere of an exoplanet
Observations of a Dust Disk around Beta Pictoris
Study of massive stars in R136 (in the Tarantula Nebula)
Study of the star Eta Carinae
Study of Supernova 1987A
Study of flows from an Active Galaxy

See also
Other Hubble instruments :
Advanced Camera for Surveys
Cosmic Origins Spectrograph
Faint Object Camera
Faint Object Spectrograph
Goddard High Resolution Spectrograph
Near Infrared Camera and Multi-Object Spectrometer
Wide Field and Planetary Camera
Wide Field and Planetary Camera 2
Wide Field Camera 3

References

External links

ESA/Hubble
The Space Telescope Imaging Spectrograph

Hubble Space Telescope instruments
Space science experiments
Space imagers